Getaway in Stockholm is a Swedish film series about illegal street racing filmed using mainly car mounted cameras along with some cameramen alongside the route. The videos are all shot in the streets of Stockholm, Sweden and have developed a worldwide underground cult reputation in the street racing scene.

Background
One film is released every year. The actual run takes place during early morning hours in late autumn when there's the least amount of traffic. The identities of the drivers and the car owners are carefully withheld, though Mr X is likely Jocke "Qvarnis" Qvarnström. So far, ten volumes of the series have been released:
 Getaway in Stockholm:1: Porsche 911 Turbo (964)
 Getaway in Stockholm 2: Toyota Supra (A80) and Ford Escort RS Cosworth
 Getaway in Stockholm 3: Honda NSX
 Getaway in Stockholm 4: Honda NSX and Chevrolet Corvette (C5)
 Getaway in Stockholm 5: Mazda RX-7 (FD3S)
 Getaway in Stockholm 6: Dodge Viper GTS and Porsche 911 GT3 (996)
 Getaway in Stockholm 7: BMW M3 CSL (E46) and BMW M5 (E39)
 Getaway in Stockholm 8: Audi RS6 (C5) and Honda CBR1000RR motorcycle
 Getaway in Stockholm 9: Porsche 911 GT3 (996) vs Porsche 911 GT3 RS (996)
 Getaway in Stockholm 10: Porsche 911 GT3 (996) and Lamborghini Gallardo

The series was the main reason Stockholm was included in the video game Project Gotham Racing 2 and is mainly influenced by the legendary short film C'était un rendez-vous.

Critique on authenticity 
In an interview with PB motorcycling magazine, Patrik Fürstenhoff, Swedish Wheelie Team Member and widely accepted as the Ghost Rider himself, had this to say:

We saw a movie called 'Getaway in Stockholm', which is a car chase movie. But it's all made up. We couldn't believe the world was raving about it. The policeman was actually a body builder, he even had baggy pants on. It wasn't real. There's a hardcore group of riders and drivers in Stockholm who do this for real, but yet the "Getaway in Stockholm" movie was a rental car pretending to be a police car and it was all in the middle of the night with empty roads. You can print this; it was shit. And we made up the Ghost Rider as a big 'you suck' to the car guys.

It is highly likely that the movie Fürstenhoff saw was the first one of the Getaway in Stockholm series. While the authenticity of the police car in the first film is questionable, there is no doubt about the authenticity of the police cars in the later parts since many of them are captured on the video less than one car-length away. As a response to Fürstenhoff's critique, Getaway in Stockholm 8 features some motorcycle scenes and some humorous scenes making fun of the Ghost Rider.

Public response 
The movie series gained questionable public attention in Finland in the aftermath of a traffic accident that took place on 13 August 2002. A local importer of the Getaway in Stockholm movies killed a nine-year-old girl by running over her with his car in Munkkivuori, Helsinki. The driver of the tuned Audi S3 (8L) car was reportedly speeding.

See also 

C'était un rendez-vous

References

Swedish auto racing films
2000s road movies
Short film series
2000s Swedish films